Pallegama is a village in Sri Lanka. It is located within Central Province. The Kotmale Oya drains into the Mahaweli River at this location.

See also
List of towns in Central Province, Sri Lanka

External links

Populated places in Kandy District